Benjamin J. Rhodes (born February 21, 1997) is an American professional stock car racing driver. He competes full-time in the NASCAR Craftsman Truck Series, driving the No. 99 Ford F-150 for ThorSport Racing. He is the 2021 Truck Series champion. Before moving up to the Truck Series, Rhodes competed full-time in what is now the ARCA Menards Series East, where he drove for Turner Scott Motorsports and won the 2014 series championship. He also has previously competed part-time in the NASCAR Cup Series, the NASCAR Xfinity Series and what is now the ARCA Menards Series.

Racing career

Early years
Rhodes began his career in 2004 when he was seven years old, starting in kart racing, winning several champion titles before moving to Bandoleros in 2008, and Legends cars in 2010, then moving up to late model stock cars beginning in 2011.

After earning several wins, in 2012 he signed with then-Sprint Cup Series driver Marcos Ambrose to begin racing Late Model cars in the UARA-STARS Series under the Marcos Ambrose Motorsports banner. After the 2012 season, Rhodes signed a deal with Turner Scott Motorsports to begin racing part-time in the NASCAR K&N Pro Series East in 2013. Rhodes scored five top five finishes in seven starts. In June of that year, Rhodes was named to the NASCAR Next roster, composed of up-and-coming drivers expected to become the next group of stars in NASCAR competition.

K&N Pro Series East
Rhodes would move full-time in the K&N East Series for 2014, with former driver Mark McFarland as his crew chief. In mid-March 2014, it was announced Rhodes would make his Camping World Truck Series debut at Martinsville in the Kroger 250 for TSM, and drive in three additional Truck series races that season. He earned three top tens, including an 8th-place finish in his debut, in four Truck Series races. Rhodes would also make his ARCA Racing Series debut at his home track Kentucky Speedway, starting fifth but finishing 27th after a crash. Rhodes would claim TSM's second consecutive K&N Pro Series East Championship through five wins, 11 top-five finishes, and six poles. Rhodes would also tie a series record set by Ricky Craven in 1991 by winning four consecutive races (Iowa, Bowman Gray, Five Flags, Langley Speedway) between May and June.

Xfinity Series
In December 2014, it was announced that Rhodes would move up to NASCAR's second-tier national series the Xfinity Series (formerly Busch and Nationwide) with JR Motorsports for 10 races in the 2015 season, sharing the No. 88 Chevrolet Camaro with Sprint Cup Series drivers Dale Earnhardt Jr., Kevin Harvick, and Kasey Kahne. Rhodes made his debut with the team at Iowa Speedway on May 16, finishing seventh. Rhodes had the fastest time in the first practice at Road America in August 2015 and he was awarded the pole position after qualifying rained out. On October 20, Rhodes announced that he had left JRM, intending to run a full-time Xfinity schedule in 2016.

Craftsman Truck Series

On December 15, 2015, Rhodes joined ThorSport Racing to run full-time in the Truck Series in 2016, driving the No. 41 Toyota Tundra. Rhodes started the season with a 7th-place finish at Daytona. Rhodes and Johnny Sauter were in contention for the win at Kansas but both crashed on the final lap, allowing William Byron to secure the first win of his career. Rhodes missed the inaugural Truck Series Chase and finished 14th in series points.

Rhodes returned to ThorSport for the 2017 season with new crew chief Eddie Troconis and renumbered No. 27 Tundra. Rhodes came close to victory at Kansas when, after passing Kyle Busch late in the race, his engine expired with 10 laps to go. On September 15, Rhodes secured a spot in the 2017 Truck Series playoffs. On September 30, Rhodes held off eventual champion Christopher Bell to win his first Truck race at the Las Vegas 350.

For 2018, Rhodes returned to the No. 41 truck, now a Ford F-150, with Troconis returning as crew chief. After being plagued by engine troubles throughout the year, he won his second career race at Kentucky Speedway after dominating the race and holding off a hard-charging Stewart Friesen. He finished the season eighth in points.

A repeat win in 2019 with ThorSport was not to be, however, as the lapped truck of Brennan Poole made contact with Rhodes in the late stages of the race, causing tire problems and relegating Rhodes to a 19th-place finish. Rhodes, irate with Poole after the race, twice tried to physically confront Poole before being pulled away. Rhodes later said he was mad at Poole because he believed the lapped truck cost him a shot at a win and a berth in the NASCAR playoffs. Later in the regular season at Eldora Speedway, Tyler Dippel forced Rhodes into the wall in the late stages of the race, again knocking Rhodes from a top-ten finish, and then rammed his truck into Rhodes on the cooldown lap. On pit road after the race, Rhodes tried to drag Dippel from his truck before calling him a dirty driver. Dippel, in return, directed an expletive-laced tirade at Rhodes and called it "cool" that Rhodes would miss the playoffs, which Rhodes indeed did. 

Rhodes returned to ThorSport in 2020. He had a tumultuous race at the SpeedyCash.com 400 in October, when contact from Rhodes caused Todd Gilliland, Christian Eckes and Josh Bilicki to retire from the race in three separate incidents. Rhodes blamed Eckes driving him into the wall for retaliation against him, and blamed Chandler Smith for the wreck with Bilicki; Rhodes later exchanged words and had a shoving match with Eckes after the race.

The 2021 season began with Rhodes winning the first race at Daytona International Speedway after passing leader Cory Roper as they approached the finish. Rhodes followed his Daytona oval win with a victory at the Daytona Road Course the next week in the BrakeBest Brake Pads 159, scoring back to back victories for the first time in his career. Rhodes won his first Truck Series championship on November 5 by finishing third in the race. Overall, Rhodes had 2 wins, 8 top five finishes, 16 top ten finishes, 19 lead lap finishes, an average finish of 9.3, and no DNF's.

In 2022, Rhodes finished second at Daytona. He DNF'd at 31st place at Las Vegas, but made up for the loss with three consecutive top-five finishes before winning at the Bristol dirt race. Rhodes finished second at Phoenix and second in the standings.

Cup Series

On May 31, 2021, it was revealed through the release of the entry list for the Cup Series race at Sonoma that Rhodes would make his debut in the series in the No. 77 for Spire Motorsports. The usual driver of that car, Justin Haley, a full-time Xfinity Series driver, was at Mid-Ohio Sports Car Course for the race in that series that weekend. Rhodes was available due to the Truck Series having an off weekend that weekend. Rhodes started 31st and finished 30th.

Other racing
In March 2019, Rhodes participated in the Michelin Pilot Challenge sports car race at Sebring International Raceway, driving a Ford for Multimatic Motorsports alongside ThorSport Racing teammates Matt Crafton, Grant Enfinger, and Myatt Snider.

Personal life
Rhodes is the son of Lori and Joe Rhodes. His father is the president of Kentucky-based mechanical service contractor Alpha Energy Solutions which has sponsored Ben's racing efforts.

Rhodes graduated from Holy Cross High School in Louisville, Kentucky in 2015, finishing with a 3.98 GPA despite missing classes due to his racing career. He missed the school's graduation ceremony on May 15 because he was in Iowa to prepare for his Xfinity Series debut the next day; the school's president traveled to the race to present Rhodes with his diploma during driver introductions.

Motorsports career results

NASCAR
(key) (Bold – Pole position awarded by qualifying time. Italics – Pole position earned by points standings or practice time. * – Most laps led.)

Cup Series

Xfinity Series

Craftsman Truck Series

 Season still in progress
 Ineligible for series points

K&N Pro Series East

ARCA Racing Series
(key) (Bold – Pole position awarded by qualifying time. Italics – Pole position earned by points standings or practice time. * – Most laps led.)

References

External links

 
 Official profile at ThorSport Racing
 

Living people
1997 births
Racing drivers from Louisville, Kentucky
NASCAR drivers
Holy Cross High School (Louisville) alumni
ARCA Menards Series drivers
NASCAR Truck Series champions
Multimatic Motorsports drivers
JR Motorsports drivers
Michelin Pilot Challenge drivers